The 2010 Eastern Kentucky Colonels football team represented Eastern Kentucky University in the 2010 NCAA Division I FCS football season. The team was led by Dean Hood, who was in his third season as head coach.  The season was the Colonels' 101st. Eastern Kentucky played their home games at Roy Kidd Stadium in Richmond, Kentucky.

Schedule

Coaching staff

References

Eastern Kentucky
Eastern Kentucky Colonels football seasons
Eastern Kentucky Colonels football